The Agreement on the Importation of Educational, Scientific and Cultural Materials (also known as the Florence Agreement) is a 1950 UNESCO treaty whereby states agree to not impose customs duties on certain educational, scientific, and cultural materials that are imported.

Content
The materials covered by the treaty include printed books, newspapers, periodicals, government publications, printed music, works of art, antiques over 100 years old, scientific instruments used in education or research, and educational films. The Agreement does not apply to materials that contain excessive amounts of advertising material.

Creation and state parties
The Agreement was approved by resolution on 17 June 1950, at a UNESCO General Conference in Florence, Italy. It was opened for signature on 22 November 1950 at Lake Success, New York and entered into force on 21 May 1952. As of 2014, it has been signed by 29 states and ratified by 102 states, which includes 101 United Nations member states plus the Holy See. The states that have signed but not ratified the Agreement are Colombia, Dominican Republic, Ecuador, Guinea-Bissau, Honduras, and Peru. There is no time limit on either signing or ratifying the Agreement.

Protocol
On 26 November 1976, the Protocol to the Agreement on the Importation of Educational, Scientific or Cultural Materials was concluded in Nairobi, Kenya. The Protocol, which is also known as the Nairobi Protocol, expands the types of materials covered by the Agreement. The Protocol entered into force on 2 January 1982 and as of 2013 has been signed by 13 states and ratified by 46 states. New Zealand and Oman have signed but not ratified the Protocol.

Notes

External links
Agreement text and information, unesco.org
Agreement signatures and ratifications, un.org
Protocol text and information, unesco.org
Protocol signatures and ratifications, un.org

1950 in Italy
1950 in New York (state)
UNESCO treaties
Treaties concluded in 1950
Treaties entered into force in 1952
Treaties of the Kingdom of Afghanistan
Treaties of Armenia
Treaties of Australia
Treaties of Austria
Treaties of Barbados
Treaties of Belgium
Treaties of Bolivia
Treaties of Bosnia and Herzegovina
Treaties of Bulgaria
Treaties of Burkina Faso
Treaties of the French protectorate of Cambodia
Treaties of Cameroon
Treaties of the Republic of the Congo
Treaties of Ivory Coast
Treaties of Croatia
Treaties of Cuba
Treaties of Cyprus
Treaties of the Czech Republic
Treaties of the Republic of the Congo (Léopoldville)
Treaties of Denmark
Treaties of the Kingdom of Egypt
Treaties of El Salvador
Treaties of Estonia
Treaties of Fiji
Treaties of Finland
Treaties of the French Fourth Republic
Treaties of Gabon
Treaties of West Germany
Treaties of Ghana
Treaties of the Kingdom of Greece
Treaties of Guatemala
Treaties of Haiti
Treaties of the Holy See
Treaties of the Hungarian People's Republic
Treaties of Pahlavi Iran
Treaties of Ba'athist Iraq
Treaties of Ireland
Treaties of Israel
Treaties of Italy
Treaties of Japan
Treaties of Jordan
Treaties of Kazakhstan
Treaties of Kenya
Treaties of Kyrgyzstan
Treaties of the Kingdom of Laos
Treaties of Latvia
Treaties of Liberia
Treaties of the Libyan Arab Republic
Treaties of Lithuania
Treaties of Luxembourg
Treaties of Madagascar
Treaties of Malawi
Treaties of the Federation of Malaya
Treaties of Mali
Treaties of Malta
Treaties of Mauritius
Treaties of Monaco
Treaties of Montenegro
Treaties of Morocco
Treaties of the Netherlands
Treaties of New Zealand
Treaties of Nicaragua
Treaties of Niger
Treaties of Nigeria
Treaties of Norway
Treaties of Oman
Treaties of the Dominion of Pakistan
Treaties of the Philippines
Treaties of the Polish People's Republic
Treaties of Portugal
Treaties of Moldova
Treaties of the Socialist Republic of Romania
Treaties of Russia
Treaties of Rwanda
Treaties of San Marino
Treaties of Serbia and Montenegro
Treaties of Sierra Leone
Treaties of Singapore
Treaties of Slovakia
Treaties of Slovenia
Treaties of the Solomon Islands
Treaties of Francoist Spain
Treaties of the Dominion of Ceylon
Treaties of Sweden
Treaties of Switzerland
Treaties of Syria
Treaties of Thailand
Treaties of North Macedonia
Treaties of Togo
Treaties of Tonga
Treaties of Trinidad and Tobago
Treaties of Tunisia
Treaties of Uganda
Treaties of the United Kingdom
Treaties of Tanganyika
Treaties of the United States
Treaties of Uruguay
Treaties of Venezuela
Treaties of the State of Vietnam
Treaties of Zambia
Treaties of Zimbabwe
Treaties of Yugoslavia
Treaties extended to West Berlin
Treaties extended to the Belgian Congo
Treaties extended to Ruanda-Urundi
Treaties extended to the French Protectorate of Tunisia
Treaties extended to Netherlands New Guinea
Treaties extended to Surinam (Dutch colony)
Treaties extended to Aruba
Treaties extended to Tokelau
Treaties extended to the Cook Islands
Treaties extended to Niue
Treaties extended to the British Solomon Islands
Treaties extended to the Gilbert and Ellice Islands
Treaties extended to Christmas Island
Treaties extended to the Cocos (Keeling) Islands
Treaties extended to the Federation of Malaya
Treaties extended to the Crown Colony of Malta
Treaties extended to British Mauritius
Treaties extended to the Colony and Protectorate of Nigeria
Treaties extended to Saint Helena, Ascension and Tristan da Cunha
Treaties extended to the Colony of Sarawak
Treaties extended to the Crown Colony of Seychelles
Treaties extended to the Colony of Sierra Leone
Treaties extended to the Crown Colony of Singapore
Treaties extended to British Somaliland
Treaties extended to Tanganyika (territory)
Treaties extended to the Crown Colony of Trinidad and Tobago
Treaties extended to the Uganda Protectorate
Treaties extended to the Sultanate of Zanzibar
Treaties extended to British Cameroon
Treaties extended to the New Hebrides
Treaties extended to British Togoland
Treaties extended to the British Leeward Islands
Treaties extended to the British Windward Islands
Treaties extended to the Colony of Barbados
Treaties extended to British Guiana
Treaties extended to British Honduras
Treaties extended to Brunei (protectorate)
Treaties extended to the Colony of Aden
Treaties extended to the Gambia Colony and Protectorate
Treaties extended to Gibraltar
Treaties extended to the Gold Coast (British colony)
Treaties extended to British Hong Kong
Treaties extended to the Colony of Jamaica
Treaties extended to British Kenya
Treaties extended to British Cyprus
Treaties extended to the Falkland Islands
Treaties extended to the Colony of North Borneo
Treaties extended to the Kingdom of Tonga (1900–1970)
Treaties extended to British Dominica
Treaties extended to Guernsey
Treaties extended to Jersey
Treaties extended to the Isle of Man
Treaties extended to the Federation of Rhodesia and Nyasaland
Treaties extended to the Colony of the Bahamas
Treaties extended to Liechtenstein
Treaties extended to the Faroe Islands
Treaties extended to Greenland
Treaties extended to the British Western Pacific Territories